El Picador  is a corregimiento in Cañazas District, Veraguas Province, Panama with a population of 3,065 as of 2010. It was created by Law 10 of March 7, 1997; this measure was complemented by Law 5 of January 19, 1998 and Law 69 of October 28, 1998. Its population as of 2000 was 3,089.

References

Corregimientos of Veraguas Province